Jakob Nufer was a Swiss veterinarian who, around 1500, reportedly performed the first successful Caesarean section in history in which the mother (his wife) survived.

His wife allegedly bore five more children, including twins, and the baby delivered by Caesarean section purportedly lived to the age of 77.

However, the story was not recorded until 1582 and many historians question its accuracy.

References 

15th-century Swiss people
16th-century Swiss physicians
Year of death unknown
Caesarean sections
Year of birth unknown